Charles Coleman Thompson (born April 11, 1961) is an American prelate of the Roman Catholic Church, serving as archbishop of the Archdiocese of Indianapolis in Indiana since 2017.  He previously served as the bishop of the Diocese of Evansville in Indiana from 2011 to 2017.

Career

Early life 
Charles Thompson was born on April 11, 1961, in Louisville, Kentucky. He attended Bellarmine College in Louisville graduating with a Bachelor of Accounting degree. Thompson earned a Master of Divinity degree at Saint Meinrad School of Theology in St. Meinrad, Indiana and a Licentiate of Canon Law at St. Paul University in Ottawa, Ontario.

Priesthood 
On May 30, 1987, Thompson was ordained into the priesthood for the Diocese of Louisville by Archbishop Thomas Kelly.  After his ordination, Thompson served until 1990 as associate pastor at St. Joseph Pro-Cathedral Parish and as chaplain at Bethlehem High School, both in Bardstown, Kentucky.  In 1992, he resumed work part-time as an associate pastor at St. Francis of Assisi Parish in Louisville. In 1993, Thompson was named metropolitan vicar and director of tribunals for the diocese. He administered St. Peter Claver Parish in Louisville from 1994 to 1996 and also served as a chaplain for the Presentation Academy in Louisville from 1995 to 1997. 

In 1996, Thompson was assigned as pastor at St. Augustine Parish in Lebanon, Kentucky. He was named defender of the bond and judge of the Diocesan Tribunal in 1998. Thompson was appointed pastor in 2002 of Holy Trinity Parish and chaplain of Sacred Heart Academy, both in Louisville.  In addition to his pastoral work at Holy Trinity, Thompson was appointed vicar general in 2008.

Bishop of Evansville

Pope Benedict XVI appointed Thompson as the fifth bishop of the Diocese of Evansville on April 26, 2011.  He was consecrated by Archbishop Joseph Kurtz on June 29, 2011, at Roberts Municipal Stadium in Evansville. The co-consecrators were Archbishop Daniel M. Buechlein,  Archbishop Thomas C. Kelly, and Bishop Gerald Gettelfinger.

Archbishop of Indianapolis
Pope Francis appointed Thompson as archbishop of the Archdiocese of Indianapolis on June 13, 2017. He was installed on July 28, 2017. Thompson was the youngest American archbishop at the time of his installation.

Soon after his installation, Thompson ordered three Catholic high schools in Indianapolis to terminate three employees who had entered into same-sex marriages:

 Brebeuf Jesuit Preparatory School refused to fire Layton Payne-Elliot, a male teacher who married Joshua Payne-Elliot in 2017.  After a period of fruitless negotiations, Thompson suspended the Catholic status of Brebeuf in June 2019.. The Jesuits appealed his decision to the Congregation for Catholic Education in Rome, which temporarily rescinded Thompson's order.  In 2020, the Holy See assigned Cardinal Joseph Tobin to mediate the dispute.
 Roncalli High School fired two guidance counselors, Shelly Fitzgerald and Lynn Starkey, both of whom had married other women.  Fitzgerald and Starkey sued the archdiocese and Thompson in separate cases, alleging discrimination and retaliation. On August 11, 2021, the US Southern District of Indiana dismissed the Starkey lawsuit.
 Cathedral High School fired Joshua Payne-Elliot, a teacher who married Layton Payne-Elliot in 2017.  In a statement, Cathedral said that defying the archbishop could have meant losing its non-profit tax status.  Payne -Elliot sued the archdiocese, but the case was dismissed in Marion County Superior Court on May 20, 2021.

See also

 Catholic Church hierarchy
 Catholic Church in the United States
 Historical list of the Catholic bishops of the United States
 List of Catholic bishops of the United States
 Lists of patriarchs, archbishops, and bishops

References

External links

Roman Catholic Archdiocese of Indianapolis Official Site

 

1961 births
Living people
21st-century Roman Catholic archbishops in the United States
Roman Catholic bishops of Evansville
Bellarmine University alumni
Saint Meinrad Seminary and School of Theology alumni
University of Ottawa alumni
Religious leaders from Louisville, Kentucky
Catholics from Kentucky